Rubus pedatus is an Asian and North American species of raspberry known under the common names five-leaved bramble, strawberryleaf raspberry and creeping raspberry.

Rubus pedatus is a low shrub or herb with thorn-less creeping stems. The leaves are alternate, deciduous, divided into 5 leaflets (hence the name) each coarsely toothed. The fruits are bright red, and consist of small clusters of drupelets, sometimes as few as one drupelet per fruit. The fruits are edible.

Rubus pedatus is found in moist mossy forests, glades, stream banks and bog forests on the Pacific coasts of eastern Russia, Oregon, Washington, British Columbia and Alaska, inland to Yukon, Alberta, and Montana.

References

External links
 photo of herbarium specimen at Missouri Botanical Garden, collected 1788 somewhere on the northern Pacific coast of North America
 
 

Berries
pedatus
Flora of Russia
Plants described in 1791
Flora of North America